Olsalazine is an anti-inflammatory medication used in the treatment of ulcerative colitis. It is sold under the brand name Dipentum.

Olsalazine itself is a pro-drug of mesalazine (5-aminosalicyclic acid or 5-ASA) and is not absorbed in the small intestine. Instead it continues through to the colon where it is cleaved into two molecules of 5-ASA by azoreductases produced by colonic bacteria. Olsalazine thus exerts its anti-inflammatory effect by its colonic breakdown into 5-ASA which inhibits cyclooxygenase and lipoxygenase thereby reducing prostaglandin and leukotriene production.

History
Olsalazine gained Food and Drug Administration (FDA) approval in 1990.

Supply
The drug is supplied by UCB Pharma.

Research
In 2006 the Australian biotech company Giaconda received a European patent for a combination therapy for treating constipation-predominant irritable bowel syndrome that uses olsalazine and the anti-gout drug colchicine, for trials the following year.

References

External links 
 

Gastroenterology
Azo compounds
Salicylic acids